Jack Schofield may refer to:

 Jack Schofield (footballer), English footballer
 Jack Lund Schofield (1923–2015), American politician, educator and businessman
 Jack Schofield (journalist), British technology journalist